The Howard Peaks are a line of east–west trending peaks at the south side of Tourmaline Plateau, extending transversely across the Deep Freeze Range in Victoria Land, Antarctica. They were mapped by the United States Geological Survey from surveys and U.S. Navy air photos, 1955–63, and were named by the Advisory Committee on Antarctic Names for Hugh C. Howard, a cook at McMurdo Station for four summer seasons, 1963–64 to 1966–67.

References

Mountains of Victoria Land
Scott Coast